The 2017–18 FK Voždovac season is the club's 5th straight season in Serbian SuperLiga.

Current squad

Youth & reserves

Players with multiple nationalities
   Borko Duronjić
   Todor Petrović

Out on loan

For recent transfers, see List of Serbian football transfers winter 2017–18. For summer transfers, see List of Serbian football transfers summer 2017.

Friendlies

Competitions

Serbian SuperLiga

Regular season

League table

Matches

Championship round

League table

References

External links
website 

FK Voždovac seasons
Voždovac